Jozandar (also Romanized as Jowz Andar) is a village in Mahyar Rural District, in the Central District of Qaen County, South Khorasan Province, Iran. At the 2006 census, its population was 17, in 6 families.

References 

Populated places in Qaen County